The 2014–15 Mascom Top 8 Cup was the fourth edition of the Mascom Top 8 Cup. It was played from October 30, 2014 to April 18, 2015 and featured the top eight teams from the 2013-14 Botswana Premier League. Gaborone United defeated Township Rollers in the final to win a record second title.

Prize money

Format
The quarterfinals and semifinals were played over two legs both home and away, with only one final in a predetermined venue. Three points were awarded for a win, one point for a draw and none for a loss. Aggregate score was used to determine the winner of a round. Where the aggregate score was equal away goals were used to pick out the victor and if those were equal the tied teams went into a penalty shootout. There was no quarterfinal draw. The teams were seeded based on their position in the table, with the first placed team facing off against the eighth placed team.

Participants

Quarterfinals

Semifinals

Final

Awards
 Top goalscorer |  Benson Shilongo | Gaborone United
 Player of the tournament |  Goitseone Phoko | Gaborone United
 Goalkeeper of the tournament |  Goitseone Phoko | Gaborone United
 Coach of the tournament |  Rahman Gumbo | Gaborone United
 Referee of the tournament |  Joshua Bondo
 Assistant referee of the tournament |  Kitso Sibanda

References

Botswana Premier League